Carolina State Navy may refer to:

North Carolina State Navy, a navy raised by the state of North Carolina during the American Revolutionary War.
South Carolina Navy, a navy raised by the state of South Carolina during the American Revolutionary War.

United States Navy
Military units and formations of the United States in the American Revolutionary War